Virgilio Nucci (1545-1620) was an Italian painter of the late-Renaissance or Mannerism period.

Biography
He was born in Gubbio. He was son of Benedetto Nucci Virgilio like his brother trained also in Rome with Daniele da Volterra.
The painter Felice Damiani left some of his painting supplies to Virgilio.

Most of his works are in Gubbio, including the Cathedral (1596), church of Sant'Agostino, and the Pinacoteca. He also painted for the church of Madonna dell'Olivo (1589) near Passignano.

References

External links

1545 births
1620 deaths
16th-century Italian painters
Italian male painters
17th-century Italian painters
Umbrian painters
Italian Renaissance painters
Mannerist painters